Prester John is a Christian king in medieval legend.

Prester John may also refer to:
Prester John (novel), 1910 novel by John Buchan
Prester John (comics), a Marvel Comics character based on the legend
Prestor Jon, a DC Comics character
 Prester John, the king of Osten Ard in the 1988–1993 trilogy Memory, Sorrow, and Thorn by Tad Williams
 Prester John, a song by the band Animal Collective from their 2022 album Time Skiffs

See also
John the Presbyter, an early Christian figure